The Song of the Shirt is a 1908 American silent drama film directed by D. W. Griffith. A partial print of the short exists in the film archive of the Library of Congress.

Cast
 Linda Arvidson as Dying Woman
 George Gebhardt as In Office / Waiter
 Robert Harron as Stock Boy
 Arthur V. Johnson as Waiter
 Florence Lawrence as Woman
 Alfred Paget
 Mack Sennett as Foreman / In Office / In Second Restaurant
 Harry Solter as Employer / In Second Restaurant

References

External links
 
The Song of The Shirt available for free download at Internet Archive

1908 films
1908 drama films
1908 short films
Silent American drama films
American silent short films
American black-and-white films
Films directed by D. W. Griffith
1900s American films